Atiyamāṉ (also known as Adhiyamān, Adigamān or Satyaputra-Atiyān) were a royal Velir dynasty. These king-chiefs ruled from their capital Tagadur (present day Dharmapuri) from at least the 3rd century BCE. The royal house was one of the four kingdoms of Tamilakam, ruling parts of the Kongu Nadu. They were surrounded by the Cheras to the west and the Pandyas and Cholas to the east.

The Atiyamāṉs are mentioned in the Puranas as well as in ancient Tamil literature. Their rule in Southern India  is mentioned in rock inscriptions of the Sangam period as well as in the Edicts of Asoka dated to the 3rd century BCE and the Gummireddipura plates with the added title Satyaputra – the "members of the fraternity of truth", synonymous with the Chera clan. Vidukalagiya Perumal, an eighth century chief of this family is described as the descendant of Adigaman Elini of Chera dynasty (vamsa) in one of his epigraphs.  A number of inscriptions in Jambai (also known as "Tirukkoyilur") add details of their sovereignty in the 1st century CE. This ruling tribe rose in prominence during the classical period of the history of Tamil Nadu. Their most famous ruler was Athiyamān Nedumān Añci, a powerful king who was one of the Kadai ezhu vallal (7 great patrons) of arts and literature in Tamilakam.

Kingdom
The Athiyamān was a small kingdom situated on the eastern valley of Malaya Mountains of the Western Ghats (Anamalai, Palani and Nilgiri).

Inscriptions
Ashoka mentions the Athiyaman clan in his inscriptions along with the Cholas, Pandyas and the Kerala putras (Cheras). The Athiyamans wielded sufficient power in the time of Asoka (3rd century BCE) almost on par with the Cheras, Cholas and Pandyas.

In several excavated Tamil-Brahmi inscriptions dated to 1st century CE found at Jambai, Tirukkoyilur of Viluppuram district, South Arcot in Tamil Nadu mention is made again of the dynasty:

The inscription mentions the Athiyā Chief Neduman Anci, a heroic historic king celebrated in volumes of the Sangam literature classics Purananuru and Akananuru. This Athiymān king was a descendant of the Satyaputra dynasty mentioned in Asoka's edicts. The inscription records the endowment of a cave-shelter by the chieftain Atiyan Netuman Anci who sports the title Satiyaputo. The inscription gives the name of his clan (Atiyan), of his father (Netuman) and of himself (Anci). This clear statement enables researchers with absolute certainty, to identify a chieftain mentioned in the Tamil Sangam literature with a personage figuring in a Tamil-Brahmi inscription.

The Satyaputra-Athiyamān wielded sufficient power in the 3rd century BCE to be considered on par with the Cheras, Cholas and Pandyas, a power which continued for the next four centuries.

The Gummireddipura plates make mention of the Satyaputra Adigaman dynasty.

See also 
 Velir
 Kingdoms of Ancient India

Notes

References
 Sastri, K.A. Nilakanta, A History of South India (1955), OUP, New Delhi
 

Tamil history
Kingdoms in the Puranas
Kadai ezhu vallal
Tamil empires and kingdoms